Basilica of Vera Cruz is a Roman Catholic Church (minor basilica) in town Caravaca de la Cruz.

The church was given the title of minor basilica by Dicastery for Divine Worship and the Discipline of the Sacraments on December 3, 2007.

References

External links 

Basilica churches in Spain